Ambrose Roscoe McCabe (June 1, 1896 – May 24, 1985) was a Democratic politician from Idaho. He served as the 27th lieutenant governor of Idaho. He was born in New Westminster, British Columbia. He was a dentist and died at his home in St. Maries, Idaho in 1985.

References

Idaho Democrats
Lieutenant Governors of Idaho
1896 births
1985 deaths
20th-century American politicians
People from New Westminster
People from St. Maries, Idaho